Theobald Dillon, 7th Viscount Dillon of Costello-Gallin (died 1691) supported King James II, was attainted on 11 May 1691, and fell in the Battle of Aughrim during the Williamite War. His attainder was reversed in favour of the 8th Viscount on 20 June 1694.

Birth and origins 
Theobald was probably born at Loughglynn, his parents' habitual residence. He was a son of Robert Dillon and his wife Rose Dillon. His father, Captain Robert Dillon of Loughglynn, was a member of the landed gentry. He was son and heir of Lucas Dillon of Loughglynn, who had been the second son of Theobald Dillon, 1st Viscount Dillon. At the time of Theobald's birth, the Dillons of Loughglynn were a cadet branch of the Viscounts Dillon. Theobald's mother was a daughter of John Dillon of Streamstown.

Theobald appears as the elder of two brothers:
Theobald (died 1691)
Lucas, died unmarried

His sisters were:
Alice or Elizabeth, married James Ferrall
Jane, married Lally
Mary, married a Dillon of Sinogweny

Marriage and children 
Theobald Dillon married Mary, daughter of Sir Henry Talbot of Templeogue, Co. Dublin, and of Mount Talbot in County Roscommon, a brother-in-law of Richard Talbot, 1st Earl of Tyrconnell. Theobald and Mary mainly lived at Kilmore, County Roscommon.

 
Theobald and Mary had six sons:
Robert, predeceased his father and died unmarried
Henry (died 1714), became the 8th Viscount Dillon
Arthur (1670–1733), became a general in French service
Christopher, captain in the Dillon regiment, died unmarried
James, in the Dillon regiment, died unmarried
Lucas, in the Dillon regiment, died unmarried

—and two daughters:
Jane, married Sir John Burke, Baronet of Mitford
Bridget

Later life 
In the 1680s Dillon was lieutenant-colonel in Clanricarde's Regiment of Guards of the Irish Army.

In 1683 Lucas Dillon, 6th Viscount Dillon, died childless at Kilfaughny, County Westmeath, despite having married twice. He was the last of the senior branch descended from Christopher Dillon of Ballylaghan. Theobald, his second cousin, was the next heir male of the 1st Viscount. Theobald inherited the title and the estate, becoming the 7th Viscount Dillon.

In 1688 Lord Dillon, as he now was, raised two regiments of foot for James II, one commanded by his eldest son, Henry Dillon, the other by his second son, Arthur Dillon. Both fought in the Williamite war in Ireland, but the second, Arthur Dillon's was sent to France with the Irish Brigade in April 1690 in exchange against the Lauzon's French Expeditionary Force.

Lord Dillon was a Roman Catholic member in the Irish House of Lords of the Patriot Parliament of 1689. On 11 May 1691 he was attainted.

Death, succession, and timeline 
Lord Dillon fell at the Battle of Aughrim on 12 July 1691. His widow was killed accidentally by the explosion of a bomb during the Siege of Limerick on 7 September 1691. As he had been attainted, his title and his lands were forfeit. However, in 1694 his son Henry managed to obtain a reversal of the attainder and succeeded to title and lands.

Notes and references

Notes

Citations

Sources 

 
 
  – Dacre to Dysart (for Dillon)
 
  – (for timeline)
 
  – Viscounts (for Dillon)

1691 deaths
17th-century Irish people
Irish soldiers in the army of James II of England
Irish soldiers in the French Army
Members of the Irish House of Lords
Theobald 07
Year of birth missing